Bijargah-e Olya (also Romanized as Bījārgāh-e ‘Olyā; also known as Bījārgāh-e Bālā) is a village in Machian Rural District, Kelachay District, Rudsar County, Gilan Province, Iran. At the 2006 census, its population was 390, in 99 families.

References 

Populated places in Rudsar County